The 1986 Virginia Slims of Newport was a women's tennis tournament played on outdoor grass courts at the Newport Casino in Newport, Rhode Island in the United States that was part of the 1986 Virginia Slims World Championship Series.It was the eighth edition of the tournament and was held from July 14 through July 20, 1986. First-seeded Pam Shriver won the singles title and earned $30,000 first-prize money.

Finals

Singles
 Pam Shriver defeated  Lori McNeil 6–4, 6–2
 It was Shriver's 2nd singles title of the year and the 13th of her career.

Doubles
 Terry Holladay /  Heather Ludloff defeated  Cammy MacGregor /  Gretchen Magers 6–1, 6–7, 6–3

See also
 1986 Hall of Fame Tennis Championships – men's tournament

References

External links
 ITF tournament edition details

Virginia Slims of Newport
Virginia Slims of Newport
1986 in sports in Rhode Island
1986 in American tennis